The Federal Agency for the Commonwealth of Independent States Affairs, Compatriots Living Abroad, and International Humanitarian Cooperation, commonly known as Rossotrudnichestvo, is an autonomous Russian federal government agency under the jurisdiction of the Russian Ministry of Foreign Affairs. It is primarily responsible for administering civilian foreign aid and cultural exchange. Rossotrudnichestvo operates in Central Asia, Latin America and Eastern Europe (but mostly in the Commonwealth of Independent States).

The agency was created from its predecessor agency by Presidential decree, signed by Russian President Dmitry Medvedev on 6 September 2008, with the aim of maintaining Russia's influence in the Commonwealth of Independent States, and to foster friendly ties for the advancement of Russia's political and economic interests in foreign states.

According to OECD estimates, 2019 official development assistance from Russia increased to US$1.2 billion.

Rossotrudnichestvo was assessed by expert observers to be organising and orchestrating synchronous pro-Russian public rallies, demonstrations, and vehicle convoys across Europe in April 2022 in support of the Russian invasion of Ukraine. Demonstrations were held simultaneously in Dublin (Ireland), Berlin, Hanover, Frankfurt (Germany), Limassol (Cyprus), and Athens (Greece).

Sanctions 
In July 2022 the EU imposed sanctions on Rossotrudnichestvo in relation to the 2022 Russian invasion of Ukraine.

See also

Notes

References

External links
  
  

Foreign relations of Russia
2008 establishments in Russia
Ministry of Foreign Affairs (Russia)
Arbat District
Civil affairs
Government agencies established in 2008
International development agencies
Organizations based in Moscow